Susan Emerson Gould (August 9, 1929 – March 9, 2017) was an American chemist and politician in the state of Washington. She served the 21st district from 1975 to 1983.

Personal life 
On August 27, 1950, Gould married Ramon Gould. They have three children. In 1960, Gould and her family moved to Edmonds, Washington.

On March 9, 2017, Gould died in Edmonds, Washington.

References

2017 deaths
1929 births
American women chemists
People from Edmonds, Washington
Politicians from Seattle
Republican Party Washington (state) state senators
Women state legislators in Washington (state)
21st-century American women